The barrel of oil equivalent (BOE) is a unit of energy based on the approximate energy released by burning one barrel (or ) of crude oil. The BOE is used by oil and gas companies in their financial statements as a way of combining oil and natural gas reserves and production into a single measure, although this energy equivalence does not take into account the lower financial value of energy in the form of gas.

The U.S. Internal Revenue Service defines a BOE as equal to 5.8 million BTU. The value is necessarily approximate as various grades of oil and gas have slightly different heating values. If one considers the lower heating value instead of the higher heating value, the value for one BOE would be approximately 5.4 GJ (see tonne of oil equivalent). Typically  or 58 CCF are equivalent to one BOE.

A commonly used multiple of the BOE is the kilo barrel of oil equivalent (kboe or kBOE), which is 1,000 BOE. Other common multiples are the million barrels per day, MMboed (or MMBOED, MMboepd, where MM denotes a million), used to measure daily production and consumption, and the BBOe (also BBOE) or billion barrels of oil equivalent, representing 109 barrels of oil, used to measure petroleum reserves.

Metric regions (consisting of all nations except the United States) commonly use the tonne of oil equivalent (TOE), or more often million TOE (MTOE). Since this is a measurement of weight, any conversion to barrels of oil equivalent depends on the density of the oil in question, as well as the energy content.

See also

References

Petroleum economics
Units of energy
Equivalent units